The 2021–22 season was Harrogate Town's 108th year in their history and second consecutive season in League Two. Along with the league, the club also competed in the FA Cup, the EFL Cup and the EFL Trophy. The season covers the period from 1 July 2021 to 30 June 2022.

Pre-season friendlies
Harrogate Town announced they will play friendly matches against Huddersfield Town, Brighouse Town, Newcastle United U23s, Rotherham United, Sunderland, Darlington and Doncaster Rovers as part of their pre-season preparations.

Competitions

League Two

League table

Results summary

Results by matchday

Matches
Harrogate Town's fixtures were announced on 24 June 2021.

FA Cup

EFL Cup

EFL Trophy

Transfers

Transfers in

Loans in

Loans out

Transfers out

Notes

References

Harrogate Town
Harrogate Town A.F.C. seasons